Audacieux was a  74-gun ship of the line of the French Navy.

Between 1791 and 1793, she was decommissioned in Lorient. She joined active service again in 1793, and the next year, she salvaged the Révolutionnaire, dismasted after the Glorious First of June.

She was eventually broken up in 1803.

See also
 List of ships of the line of France

References

Ships of the line of the French Navy
Téméraire-class ships of the line
1784 ships